Herson Capri Freire (born 8 November 1951) is a Brazilian actor.

Biography 

He began his career by performing in several theatre productions at Pontifícia Universidade Católica de São Paulo when he was studying Economics. He was hired by Rede Globo in 1984.

Career

Television 
 2014 – Em Família .... Ricardo
 2013 – Sangue Bom .... Plínio Campana
 2011 – Aquele Beijo .... Alberto Lemos de Sá
 2011 – Insensato Coração .... Horácio Cortez
 2010 – A Princesa e o Vagabundo .... Rei Lindolfo
 2008 – Negócio da China .... Adriano Fontanera
 2008 – Casos e Acasos .... Hugo
 2007 – Duas Caras .... João Vitor de Moraes (Joca)
 2006 – Cobras e Lagartos .... Otaviano Pacheco
 2004 – Como uma Onda .... Sandoval
 2004 – Sob Nova Direção (episode Seu Filho, Meu Tesouro) .... Rodolfo
 2004 – Um Só Coração .... Fernão Queirós Chaves
 2002 – Brava Gente (episode Entre o Céu e a Terra) .... Agenor
 2002 – Desejos de Mulher .... Diogo Valente
 2001 –  Sítio do Picapau Amarelo .... São Jorge
 1999 – Vila Madalena .... Arthur
 1998 – Era Uma Vez .... Álvaro
 1996 – Anjo de Mim .... Marco Monterrey
 1995 – Explode Coração .... Ivan
 1994 – Tropicaliente .... Ramiro
 1993 – Renascer .... Teodoro
 1992 – Anos Rebeldes .... Comandante
 1992 – Teresa Batista .... Justo
 1991 – Felicidade .... Mário Silvano
 1990 – Meu Bem, Meu Mal .... Cláudio Venturini
 1990 – Riacho Doce .... Carlos
 1990 – A, E, I, O... Urca .... Michael
 1989 – Cortina de Vidro .... Frederico Stuart
 1989 – Tieta .... Lucas
 1988 – Olho por Olho .... Antônio Barjal
 1987 – O Outro .... Gabriel
 1985 – De Quina pra Lua .... Soares
 1984 – Partido Alto .... Sérgio
 1984 – Caso Verdade, Esperança .... Maurício
 1983 – Caso Verdade, O Homem sem Rosto .... Ivo
 1983 – Guerra dos Sexos .... Fábio Marino
 1982 – Elas por Elas .... Carlos
 1982 – Pic Nic Classe C .... Franco
 1982 – Maria Stuart
 1981 – Partidas Dobradas .... Dalmo
 1981 – O Fiel e a Pedra
 1981 – O Vento do Mar Aberto .... Onório
 1981 – Os Imigrantes .... Antonio di Salvio
 1980 – Um Homem Muito Especial .... Luiz
 1976 – Tchan! A Grande Sacada.... Bernardo
 1975 – Vila do Arco

Films 
 2013 – Minha Mãe é uma Peça
 2011 – Não Se Preocupe, Nada Vai Dar Certo
 2010 – As Mães de Chico Xavier
 2005 – Quanto Vale ou É por Quilo?
 2003 – O Preço da Paz
 2001 – A Partilha
 2000 – Eu Não Conhecia Tururu
 1999 – O Dia da Caça
 1998 – Imagens Distorcidas
 1996 – O Guarani
 1991 – Manobra Radical
 1990 – O Escorpião Escarlate
 1985 – Kiss of the Spider Woman
 1980 – Ariella
 1979 – O Caçador de Esmeraldas
 1979 – A Noite dos Imorais

Theatre  
 2010 – Conversando com mamãe 
 2008 – A Noviça Rebelde
 2008 – Cartas de Amor
 2007 – Paixão de Cristo de Nova Jerusalém ... Poncio Pilatos
 2006 – Um Marido Ideal
 2005 – Triunfo Silencioso
 2004 – Trindade
 2003 – Anjos de Cara Suja
 2002 – Com a Pulga Atrás da Orelha
 2000 – Três Homens Baixos
 2000 – La Barca D’América
 1999 – Paixão de Cristo de Nova Jerusalém ... Jesus Cristo 
 1998 – Paixão de Cristo de Nova Jerusalém ... Poncio Pilatos 
 1995 – Abelardo, Heloísa
 1994 – Julio Cesar
 1993 – Gilda, Um Projeto de Vida
 1990 – Boca Molhada de Paixão Calada
 1988 – Ladrão Que Rouba Ladrão
 1987 – Fala Baixo Senão Eu Grito
 1986 – A Honra Perdida de Katarina Blum
 1984 – Um Casal Aberto mas non Troppo 
 1982 – Pegue e Não Pague
 1979 – Sob o Signo da Discotéque
 1978 – Chuva e Caixa de Sombras
 1977 – A Morte do Caixeiro Viajante
 1977 – A Insólita Tragédia de Romeu Durbini
 1975 – Lição de Anatomia
 1974 – Dr. Zote e Ricardo III
 1972 – Teatro universitário na PUC-SP

Stage Director 

 2010 – Conversando Com Mamãe
 2008 – A Casa da Madrinha
 2007 – Eu Sou Minha Própria Mulher
 1999 – La Barca D’América

Personal life
Herson Capri has four children: Laura (b. 1976), theatre director Pedro Freire (b. 1979), Lucas (b. 1998) and Luiza (b. 2001); the latter two with his current wife, director and doctor Susana Garcia. Capri got over lung cancer in 1999.

Awards and honours
He was nominated for the Barão do Serro Azul award for his performance in the film O Preço da Paz, where he played Barão do Serro Azul.

References

External links 
 

1951 births
Living people
People from Ponta Grossa
Brazilian people of Italian descent
Brazilian male television actors
Brazilian male film actors
Brazilian male stage actors